The Eugene A. Brewster House is a historic house located at 264 Grand Street in Newburgh, New York. Built in 1865, the year Newburgh incorporated as a city, it was designed by English immigrant architect Frederick Clarke Withers for attorney Eugene Augustus Brewster.  It is the last residence Withers designed in Newburgh, where he began his career as a practicing architect in the mid-1850s.

Description and history 
The house is three-story, hipped roof brick structure broken by a gabled central projection, a massing copied from the Halsey Stevens House (1855) by Withers and Calvert Vaux of a decade prior. Similar to the Stevens house's fenestration, Withers used rectangular windows slightly smaller on the second floor and rounded openings in the projection. Canted dormers—a technique of his former partner Vaux—complete the bays flanking the main entrance. The center gable and dormers have saw-cut quatrefoil panels and carved barge rafters with similar ends to those found beneath the slated hipped roof. Around the rounded arch door and above second floor window are bichromatic bands of stone forming Florentine arches connected with brownstone impost moldings. This High Victorian Gothic trait distinguishes the house from Withers's earlier Stevens project, expressing his interest in John Ruskin and architectural trends in England. 

Brewster and his wife Anna were transferred the property 16 February 1865 by Fanny C. Crawford, who began selling off the pasture surrounding her house in the 1860s. Construction began soon after, and probably finished by year's end or in early 1866. John Little was the mason.   

Eugene A. Brewster (1827–1898) was born in New York City to Timothy and Juliet Brewster. His grandfather, Samuel Brewster, was a patriot, blacksmith, and enslaver in New Windsor, New York, famed for forging part of the Great Chain during the Revolutionary War. The family relocated to the area in 1831, Timothy Brewster investing in a lumber yard at Water and Fourth Streets in Newburgh. 

Brewster as a young man entered the law office of the Hon. John W. Brown, a fierce Scottish American judge in Newburgh. He became licensed In 1848, and between 1850–55 worked as Nathan Reeve's partner.  In 1859 he married Anna Wilhelmina Brown (1836–1915), daughter of Francis E. Ludlow and the Episcopal minister John Brown of St. George's Episcopal Church in Newburgh. The couple had four children: Francis Elizabeth Brewster (1862–1865), Eugene Brewster, jr. (1866–1892), George Richard Brewster (1873–1936), and Anna Wilhelmina Brewster (1875–1966). 

Withers used the form of the house again in 1867 with his plans for the President's House at Gallaudet College, Washington DC and successive teachers' residences there. Like plans II and VI in his once employer Andrew Jackson Downing's Cottage Residences (1842), the hipped roof-square house plan was influential during the Gothic Revival following the publication of the Stevens house in Vaux's Villas and Cottages (1857).

References 

 Kowsky, Francis R. The Architecture of Frederick Clarke Withers and the Progress of the Gothic Revival in America after 1850. Middletown, CT: Wesleyan University Press, 1980. 

 Nutt, John J. Newburgh: Her Institutions, Industries and Leading Citizens. Newburgh, New York: Ritchie & Hull, Newburgh Journal, 1891. 
Buildings and structures in Newburgh, New York
Gothic Revival architecture in New York (state)
Houses in Orange County, New York
Historic district contributing properties in New York (state)
Frederick Clarke Withers buildings